Acaciella is a Neotropical genus of flowering plants in the legume family, Fabaceae, and its subfamily Mimosoideae. Its centre of diversity is along the Mexican Pacific coast. They are unarmed, have no extrafloral nectaries and the polyads of their pollen are 8-celled. Though its numerous free stamens (sometimes >300) is typical of Acacia s.l., it has several characteristics in common with genus Piptadenia (tribe Mimoseae). Its pollen and free amino acids resemble that of Senegalia. Molecular studies place it sister to a monophyletic clade comprising elements of genus Acacia, and the tribe Ingeae. A nectary ring is present between the stamens and ovary, in common with Acacia subg. Aculeiferum.

Species 
Acaciella angustissima (Mill.) Britton & Rose—Prairie acacia, Prairie wattle, Fern acacia
var. angustissima  (Mill.) Britton & Rose
var. chisosiana —Chisos acacia, Chisos prairie acacia, Prairie acacia
var. filicoides (Cav.) L. Rico
var. hirta —Prairie acacia
var. shrevei —Shreve's Prairie acacia
var. suffrutescens —Prairie acacia
var. texensis (Nutt. ex Torrey & A. Gray) L. Rico—Prairie wattle, Whiteball acacia
Acaciella barrancana (H. Gentry) L. Rico
Acaciella bicolor Britton & Rose
Acaciella chamelensis (L. Rico) L. Rico
Acaciella glauca (L.) L. Rico—Yellow tamarind acacia, (Jamaica) Yellow tamarind
Acaciella goldmanii Britton & Rose
Acaciella hartwegii (Benth.) Britton & Rose
Acaciella igualensis Britton & Rose
Acaciella lemmonii (Rose) L. Rico
Acaciella painteri Britton & Rose
var. houghii (Britton & Rose) L. Rico
var. painteri Britton & Rose
Acaciella rosei (Standl.) L. Rico
Acaciella sotoi L. Rico
Acaciella sousae (L. Rico) L. Rico
Acaciella tequilana (S. Wats.) Britton & Rose
var. crinita (Rose) L. Rico
var. pubifoliolata L. Rico
var. tequilana (S. Wats.) Britton & Rose
Acaciella villosa (Sw.) Britton & Rose

References 

Daniel J. Murphy (2008), A review of the classification of Acacia.

 
Fabaceae genera
Neotropical realm flora